Canton or Cantonese porcelain is the characteristic style of ceramic ware decorated in Guangzhou, the capital of Guangdong and (prior to 1842) the sole legal port for export of Chinese goods to Europe. As such, it was one of the major forms of exportware produced in China in the 18th and 20th centuries.

History
Typically, the exportware was made, glazed, and fired at Jingdezhen but decorated with enamels in Guangzhou (then usually romanized as Canton) for export to the west via the Thirteen Factories of the Canton System. Canton famille rose in the 19th century was typically decorated with figures and birds, flowers and insects, predominantly in pink and green.
 
The decorative famille rose patterns used in export wares may be given names: Rose Canton which is decorated with flowers, birds and insects but with no human figures; Rose Mandarin with human figures as the main subject and introduced in the late 18th century; and Rose Medallion which has different panels that may be of different subjects and introduced in the 19th century.

See also 
Cantonese culture

References

External links 

 Paintings of the Traditional Porcelain Process Derek Philip Au. Several series of paintings, with links to sources.
 Trading China Google Arts and Culture presentation of Hong Kong Maritime Museum albums.

Chinese porcelain
Cantonese folk art
History of Guangzhou